The Jirajaran languages are group of extinct languages once spoken in western Venezuela in the regions of Falcón and Lara.  All of the Jirajaran languages appear to have become extinct in the early 20th century.

Languages
Based on adequate documentation, three languages are definitively classified as belonging to the Jirajaran family:

Jirajara, spoken in the state of Falcón
Ayomán, spoken in the village of Siquisique in the state of Lara
Gayón, spoken at the sources of the Tocuyo River in the state of Lara

Loukotka includes four additional languages, for which no linguistic documentation exists:

Coyone, spoken at the sources of the Portuguesa River in the state of Portuguesa
Cuiba, spoken near the city of Aricagua
Atatura, spoken between the Rocono and Tucupido rivers
Aticari, spoken along the Tocuyo River

Mason (1950) lists:

Gayón (Cayon)
Ayomán
Xagua
Cuiba (?)
Jirajara

Classification
The Jirajaran languages are generally regarded as isolates.  Adelaar and Muysken note certain lexical similarities with the Timotean languages and typological similarity to the Chibchan languages, but state that the data is too limited to make a definitive classification.  Jahn, among others, has suggested a relation between the Jirajaran language and the Betoi languages, mostly on the basis of similar ethnonyms.  Greenberg and Ruhlen classify Jirajaran as belonging to the Paezan language family, along with the Betoi languages, the Páez language, the Barbacoan languages and others.

Language contact
Jolkesky (2016) notes that there are lexical similarities with the Sape, Timote-Kuika, and Puinave-Kak language families due to contact.

Typology
Based on the little documentation that exists, a number of typological characteristics are reconstructable:

1. VO word order in transitive clauses
apasi mamán (Jirajara)
I.cut my.hand
I cut my hand

2. Subjects precede verbs
depamilia buratá (Ayamán)
the.family is.good
The family is good

3. Possessors which precede the possessed
shpashiú yemún (Ayamán)
arc its.rope
the arc of the rope

4. Adjectives follow the nouns they modify
pok diú (Jirajara)
hill big
big hill

5. Numerals precede the nouns they quantify
boque soó (Ayamán)
one cigarette
one cigarette

6. Use of postpositions, rather than prepositions
angüi fru-ye (Jirajara)
I.go Siquisique-to
I go to Siquisique.

Vocabulary comparison
Jahn (1927) lists the following basic vocabulary items.

{|class="wikitable sortable"
|+Comparison of Jirajaran vocabulary, based on Jahn (1927)
|-
!width="75"|English
!width="75"|Ayomán
!width="75"|Gayón
!width="75"|Jirajara
|-
|fire||dug||dut, idú||dueg
|-
|foot||a-sengán||segué||angán
|-
|hen||degaró||digaró||degaró
|-
|house||gagap||hiyás||gagap
|-
|snake||huhí, jují||jují||túb
|-
|sun||iñ||yivat||yuaú
|}

Loukotka (1968) lists the following basic vocabulary items.

{|class="wikitable sortable"
|+Comparison of Jirajaran vocabulary, based on Loukotka (1968)
! gloss !! Jirajara !! Ayomán !! Gayón
|-
| one ||  || bógha || 
|-
| two ||  || auyí || 
|-
| three ||  || mongañá || 
|-
| head || a-ktegi || a-tógh || is-tóz
|-
| ear || a-uñán || a-kivóugh || himigui
|-
| tooth ||  || a-king || 
|-
| man || iyít || yúsh || yus
|-
| water || ing || ing || guayí
|-
| fire || dueg || dug || dut
|-
| sun || yuaú || iñ || yivat
|-
| maize || dos || dosh || dosivot
|-
| bird ||  || chiskua || chiskua
|-
| house || gagap || gagap || hiyás
|}

Further reading
Oramas, L. (1916). Materiales para el estudio de los dialectos Ayamán, Gayón, Jirajara, Ajagua. Caracas: Litografía del Comercio.
Querales, R. (2008). El Ayamán. Ensayo de reconstrucción de un idioma indígena venezolano. Barquisimeto: Concejo Municipal de Iribarren.

References

 
Languages of Venezuela
Extinct languages of South America
Language families